Cochylimorpha clathratana is a species of moth of the family Tortricidae. It is found in European Russia.

The wingspan is 15–16 mm. Adults have been recorded on wing from May to August.

References

Moths described in 1880
Cochylimorpha
Moths of Europe